Nu River Bridge is a railroad bridge part of the Dali–Ruili Railway in China's Yunnan province. Construction started January 24, 2016. The steel truss arch bridge has a main span of 490 meters and a total length of 1024 meters, with the bridge deck being 211 meters above the Nu River.

Notes

Bridges in Yunnan
Transport in Baoshan, Yunnan
Proposed bridges in China